Dithiobenzoic acid is the organosulfur compound with the formula C6H5CS2H.  It is a dithiocarboxylic acid, an analogue of benzoic acid, but more acidic and deeply colored.

Synthesis and reactions
It can be prepared by sulfiding benzal chloride: 
C6H5CCl3 + 4 KSH → C6H5CS2K + 3 KCl + 2 H2S
C6H5CS2K + H+ → C6H5CS2H + K+

It also arises by the reaction of the Grignard reagent phenylmagnesium bromide with carbon disulfide, followed by acidification:
C6H5MgBr + CS2 → C6H5CS2MgBr
C6H5CS2MgBr + HCl → C6H5CS2H + MgBrCl

It is about 100x more acidic than benzoic acid. Its conjugate base, dithiobenzoate, undergoes S-alkylation to give dithiocarboxylate esters. Similarly, dithiobenzoate reacts with "soft" metal salts to give complexes, e.g. Fe(S2CC6H5)3 and Ni(S2CC6H5)2.  

Chlorination of dithiobenzoic acid gives the thioacyl chloride C6H5C(S)Cl.

References

Organic acids
Organosulfur compounds